Sant'Anastasia is a church of the Dominican Order in Verona, northern Italy.  In Gothic style, it is located in the most ancient part of the city, near the Ponte Pietra.

History
The current church was started in 1280 and completed in 1400, designed by the Dominican friars Fra' Benvenuto da Imola and Fra' Nicola da Imola. It took its name from a pre-existing temple built by King Theoderic the Great upon which was built the actual church. Since 1307, it is in fact co-entitled to St. Peter of Verona, martyr and co-patron of the city.

Consecrated only in 1471, until 1808 the church was held by the Dominicans.

The 72 m tall belltower had four bells in 1460, the fifth was added in 1650. In the 1839, the 9 bells were cast and tuned in C; they are rung in Veronese bellringing art by a local team founded in 1776.

The church is similar in structure to the Basilica of San Zanipolo in Venice.

Façade
The façade is divided into three vertical section corresponding to the nave and the two aisles in the interior.  Unfinished, the façade is mostly in brickwork.  In the centre of the middle section is a simply rose window.

The 15th century portal has two doors, and is enclosed into a Gothic structure (1330) with arches supported by ornamental columns in red, black and white marble. The arches forms three lunettes: in the larger one is a representation of the Holy Trinity with two Angels, flanked by St. Joseph and the Holy Virgin. The Father sits on a Gothic throne with Crucifix on his knees and Christ on his side, surmounted by a dove. In the two smaller lunettes, directly over the portal, are portrayed the Bishop leading the Veronese people and St. Peter of Verona leading the friars, with the white-black banner of the Dominicans. The five splays of the Gothic arch are decorated with six chronological scenes of Jesus' life: the Annunciation, the Birth, the Adoration of the Magi, the Path towards the Calvary, the Crucifixion and the Resurrection. The central column between the doors has high-reliefs with St. Dominic, St. Peter of Verona and St. Thomas.

The architrave has three statues: the central and larger is Madonna with Child of Venetian school, while the other represents St. Anastasia and St. Catherine at the Wheel.

The side sections of the façade, corresponding to the aisles, have large stainglassed mullioned windows, flanked by two square belfries.

Interior
The interior, on the Latin cross plan, is divided into a nave and two aisles, with crossed vaults, separated by six columns each; the latter are in white or red Verona marble, with Gothic capitals. The four columns over the high altar show the coat of arms of the Castelbarco of Trento, a family who extensively contributed to the church's construction. Notable is the funerary monument to Cortesia Serego, on the left of the apse, which was finished in 1432 by Vincenzo di Stefano da Verona. It portrays the riding figure of Cortesia, clad with an armor and holding a commanding wand. His horse stands upon the sculpted sarcophagus, which has always been empty. The fresco part represents the Annunciation and the Saints Peter of Verona and Dominic.

The two stoups before the first two columns stands on two hunchback figures, one of which attributed to Paolo Veronese's elder son, Gabriele Caliari.

The Pellegrini Chapel houses the late International Gothic fresco of St. George and the Princess, main work of Pisanello, as well as  terra-cotta statues by Michele di Firenze, executed before 1436. A frieze by the latter, or by Pisanello, has now disappeared.  The Pellegrini chapel also houses the grave of Wilhelm von Bibra.

The church ends with a large apse.

Exterior
To the left of the church entrance, Guglielmo di Castelbarco, podestà of Verona, built an arch that became his tomb (Arca) anticipating the more famous Scaliger Tombs.

Notes

Sources

External links

  Concerto on the bells of S. Anastasia, Verona.  9 bells, cast 1839, tenor 1787 kg (35-0-20, 3,940 lbs), 143 cm tuned to C (in Italian "Do").

Roman Catholic churches completed in 1400
15th-century Roman Catholic church buildings in Italy
Anastasia
Dominican churches
Gothic architecture in Verona